Rudolf Hermann Eisenmenger (7 August 1902 – 3 November 1994) was an Austrian artist.

Life
Professor Eisenmenger belonged to the Danube Swabians of Transylvania. He was born in Piskitelep, until 1918 part of Austria-Hungary, afterwards belonging to Romania. Between 1918 and 1921 he had Romanian citizenship, from 1922 Austrian and after 1938 German.

In 1936 he won a silver medal in the art competitions of the Olympic Games for his "Läufer vor dem Ziel" ("Runners at the Finishing Line").

He is known for the mural, Homecoming of the Ostmark, which shows the proud and glorious return of Austria to the German Empire 1938 after the Anschluss Österreichs in two parts, both seven metres wide. It was exhibited at the Great German Art Exhibition (Große Deutsche Kunstausstellung; GDK) of 1941 in Munich. In a highly controversial decision Eisenmenger was selected to create a large-scale picture for the safety curtain of the Vienna State Opera in 1955.

Decorations and awards
 1923: Lampi-Preis (Akademie der Bildenden Künste)  
 1925: Kleber-Preis
 1927: Meisterschulpreis  
 1929: Rompreis für das „Bildnis auf goldenem Grund” und den Tapisserieentwurf „Tageszeiten” 
1933:    Jubiläumspreis der Schützengilde (Wiener Künstlerhaus)  
1936:    Silberne Medaille im olympischen Kunstwettbewerb für das Bild „Läufer vor dem Ziel”  
1936:    Österreichisches Verdienstkreuz für Kunst und Wissenschaft  
1936:    Goldene Ehrenmedaille des Künstlerhauses Wien  
1936:    Preis der Stadt Wien für Malerei
1938:    Anton-Waldvogel-Stiftungspreis (Wiener Künstlerhaus)  
1938:   Preis der Stadt Wien 
1941:    Künstlerhaus-Jubiläumspreis  
1942:    Albrecht-Dürer-Preis (Nürnberg) 
 1944: Schirach-Preis  
1956:    Silberne Mitgliedsnadel des Wiener Künstlerhauses 
1957: Austrian Cross of Honour for Science and Art, 1st class
 1972: Goldener Lorbeer des Wiener Künstlerhauses 
1973: Grand Silver Medal for Services to the Republic of Austria

References

External links 
 official website 
 Rudolf Hermann Eisenmenger, Thule Art Gallery
 Rudolph Hermann Eisenmenger, German Art Gallery

1902 births
1994 deaths
Austrian artists
Olympic silver medalists in art competitions
Austrian people of Hungarian descent
People from Simeria
Recipients of the Grand Decoration for Services to the Republic of Austria
Recipients of the Austrian Cross of Honour for Science and Art, 1st class
Medalists at the 1936 Summer Olympics
Olympic competitors in art competitions